Desurabbits (stylized as ), was a Japanese idol group based in Tokyo. Alongside contemporary idol groups such as Babymetal, they are notable for being one of the early pioneers of the death metal/J-pop cross-over music style known as "japanese death pop". Their third album (released on 31 March 2021) debuted at number 86 in the weekly Oricon album sales charts and their eleventh single (released on 15 April 2020) debuted at number 20 in the weekly Oricon single sales charts, making it their most commercially successful single to date.

History

Formed in November 2013, the group's three female members were originally part of the  idol group and initially performed on a shared billing with them at the same venues.

In a spoof video message to fans published on 13 November 2016, the group announced that they had disbanded and the members had all gone their separate ways because they had become disenchanted with the idol business. In its place, a "new" group called  was to be formed.

On 1 January 2019 the group announced the arrival of a "rabbit revolution", a reference to the forthcoming announcement on 5 February 2019 that the group's name would be changing to DESURABBITS for the release of their ninth single .

During a live-streamed performance in November 2020 (on the seventh anniversary of the group's formation), the group announced that they intended to disband in June 2021. Reasons cited for this decision mentioned the length of time the group had been together and the members now wanting to pursue new opportunities, and also the effect the Coronavirus pandemic had had on the group's long-term viability; this effect was more pronounced for DESURABBITS because of their focus on live performances rather than album/single sales. The group's final live solo performance was on 20 June 2021 at the Zepp Haneda music venue in Tokyo.

The group's fans are collectively known as the "DESURABBITS Army".

Members

The group is composed of three female artists (Yuzu Okawa, Emi Mochizuki and Karin Yasui) and one male artist (Akira Kanzaki, officially known as Bucho). The notes added to some of their online music videos describe the group as "[this] unique collaboration, Bucho and three little junior high school girls" who are "dreaming to become famous Japanese idols". Bucho is the group's founder and producer, and plays a prominent role in live performances as well as appearing on most of the group's songs.

Each of the group members has an assigned colour, which was used extensively on cover art for the first two albums and six singles to help distinguish the female members as the artwork only included cartoon/artistic representations of them rather than actual photos. In 2019 the colour scheme was informally discontinued, with the group now wearing themed outfits incorporating the new logo. For the release of their eleventh single  a new colour scheme was introduced.

Music style

The group's songs exhibit an eclectic mix of influences, including death metal, J-pop, kawaii metal, jazz fusion, electronic dance music and digital hardcore. Bucho's trademark death metal growl, together with the complex structures, unconnected melodies and unexpected style changes found in some of the songs, do not easily fit the conventional idol song format, suggesting the group may be more "anti-idol" than "idol". The group have also recorded traditional ballad-style songs with piano accompaniment.

A common motif in many of the group's songs is the use of the onomatopoeic gitaigo phrase "pyon pyon", to suggest the hopping sound that rabbits make. Their songs are also notable for including humorous dialogue between Bucho and the female members, usually with Bucho giving orders to the girls in the style of a military commander or the girls answering back at Bucho or making fun of him. In  Yuzu remarks mid-song that "we can never understand anything Bucho says, so anyway...", and in  the girls decide part-way through the song that the lyrics are too depressing and they're going to change them to make the song happier and more positive.

An overriding theme of the group's first two albums, which might technically be considered concept albums, describes a future alien invasion of earth. In  this theme is discussed in detail and the accompanying music video includes scenes where a UFO arrives on earth and starts attacking cities while the group look on in disbelief. The success (or otherwise) of this invasion is dependent on whether humans can put aside their differences to work together to fend off the alien threat. In order for the group to survive and realise their dream of success, they must compete against the vast promotional budgets of the major talent agencies and record labels. In  Bucho talks about a "fixed game", suggesting that the threat they are battling against has an unfair advantage.

Discography

Singles

Albums

Live DVDs

Music videos

1 Ticket 4 Ramen

On 24 September 2017 the group held a live concert at the Shinjuku Blaze music venue in Tokyo in aid of the "1 Ticket 4 Ramen" project, a fundraising event to help feed deprived children in the Philippines by donating 4 packets of instant ramen noodles for every ticket purchased. The name of the project was inspired by the group's love of ramen, which lead to the creation of their limited edition  singles released between 2014-2018 that saw the CDs shipped in packets of instant ramen noodles. From the proceeds of the fundraiser, the group co-ordinated with a Philippines-based volunteer organisation to distribute 1,312 packets to children in Pandanon Island in central Visayas. During the trip Emi kept a video log of her time spent on the island, which also included a visit to a local elementary school where she performed songs for the students.

Collaboration

The group has appeared in live performances with other Japanese idol groups including Ladybaby and Deadlift Lolita. In 2018 DESURABBITS and Deadlift Lolita launched a crowdfunding appeal to perform a live concert in Taiwan, which was successfully funded and took place at Jack's Studio in Taipei on 28 July 2018.

References

External links
  
 DESURABBITS Blog 
 DESURABBITS YouTube Channel
 DESURABBITS Twitter Account

2013 establishments in Japan
Japanese idol groups
Musical groups established in 2013
Musical groups from Tokyo